Alburnus mentoides is a species of ray-finned fish in the genus Alburnus that is endemic to Crimea (Black and Azov Sea basins) in Ukraine.

References

Alburnus
Fish described in 1859
Endemic fauna of Ukraine
Freshwater fish